Joan Hartock (born 17 February 1987) is a Martiniquais footballer who most recently played as a goalkeeper for US Quevilly-Rouen. He previously played for Brest and Lyon.

Club career

Early years
Hartock began his football career with Martinique club US Robert. He moved to French giants Olympique Lyonnais in 2004, still only 17 years old. He played mainly for Lyon's B team in the CFA, and was the first team's third keeper for a number of years. He was released in 2011, having never made an official first team appearance for Lyon in his seven-year spell at the club.

In his spell of free agency, Hartock had trials with Aston Villa, Nantes,  Neuchâtel Xamax and OGC Nice.

Brest
On 11 August 2011, he signed a one-year contract with Stade Brestois 29. He made his début for Brest in a Coupe de France match against Niort on 7 January 2012,  his first competitive first-team appearance for any side in French football. At the end of the 2011–12 season, Hartock signed a two-year contract extension with Brest. He made a further three Coupe de France appearances in the 2012–13 season, along with his début Ligue 1 match, a 2–1 defeat to Lille on 31 March 2013.

Hartock was the first-choice keeper for Brest in the 2015–16 and 2016–17 Ligue 2 seasons, playing in 36 games in each season. However he was replaced by manager Jean-Marc Furlan in May 2017 after two poor home performances. At the end of the 2016–17 season he was released from the final year of his contract.

Quevilly-Rouen
Immediately after leaving Brest, Hartock signed with newly-promoted Ligue 2 side US Quevilly-Rouen. He made 32 appearances, but the club were relegated at the end of the first season, and Hartock left due to budget constraints.

References

External links
 

Living people
1987 births
Martiniquais footballers
Martinique international footballers
French footballers
Association football goalkeepers
Ligue 1 players
Ligue 2 players
Olympique Lyonnais players
Stade Brestois 29 players
US Quevilly-Rouen Métropole players